Mono-ideologies are a concept in Russian political and philosophical discourse.

Mono-ideologies have been described as fundamentally being linked to totalitarianism and Millenarianism.

A totalitarian political system requires an equally total mono-ideology. It can be built on various grounds: nationalist, class, but in any case, it performs two main functions - legitimizing the power of the party (state) and mobilizing the masses. 

Alexander Yakovlev criticized mono-ideologies in 1993. He was called the "godfather of glasnost" as he is considered to be the intellectual force behind Mikhail Gorbachev's reform program of glasnost and perestroika.

Slavic Native Faith and mono-ideologies 

Rodnovery is critical towards mono-ideologies.  By "mono-ideologies", they mean all those ideologies which promote "universal and one-dimensional truths", unable to grasp the complexity of reality and therefore doomed to failure one after the other. These mono-ideologies include Christianity and the Abrahamic monotheisms in general, and all the systems of thought and practice that these religions spawned throughout history, including both Marxism and capitalism, the general Western rationalistic mode of thinking begotten by the Age of Enlightenment, and ultimately the technocratic civilisation based on the idea of possession, exploitation and consumption of the environment. They are regarded as having led the world and humanity to a dead-end, and as destined to disappear and to be supplanted by the values represented by Rodnovery itself. To the "unipolar" world created by the mono-ideologies, and led by the American-influenced West, the Rodnovers oppose their political philosophy of "nativism" and "multipolarism".

Old Testament theology and Christianity are regarded by Rodnovers as the primary cause of the degradation of the world and of humanity, as the root of all the "mono-ideologies" promoting "universal and one-dimensional truths" and smothering the multiplicity of reality. These "mono-ideologies" comprehend all their secular ideological products, including both Marxism and capitalism, the general Western rationalism begotten by the Age of Enlightenment, and ultimately the technocratic civilisation based on the idea of possession, exploitation and consumption of the environment. For its claim to have a monopoly on truth, Rodnovers often equate Christianity with Soviet Marxism. The Russian volkhv Dobroslav (Aleksey Dobrovolsky) declared that:

All these ideologies, based on the principle of the verb "to have", are thought by Rodnovers to be the iteration of the existential model introduced by Abrahamic theology and Christian theology in particular, which "paradoxically combines the broadest freedom of human personality with the ontological primacy of the absolute" God and his deterministic will.

See also
 Eurasianism
 Slavic Native Faith
 Metamodernism
 Slavic Native Faith and mono-ideologies

Notes

References

Citations

Sources

 
 
 
 
 
 
 
 
 
 
 
 
 
 
 
 
 
 
 
 
 
 
 

Slavic neopaganism
Russian philosophy